Filipe Sucena Morais Sarmento (born 16 March 1985 in Mortágua, Viseu District) is a Portuguese footballer who plays for A.C. Marinhense as a right back or a right midfielder.

References

External links
 
 
 

1985 births
Living people
Portuguese footballers
Association football defenders
Association football midfielders
Primeira Liga players
Liga Portugal 2 players
Segunda Divisão players
Associação Académica de Coimbra – O.A.F. players
G.D. Tourizense players
Varzim S.C. players
S.C. Covilhã players
FC Pampilhosa players
C.D. Fátima players
US Lusitanos Saint-Maur players
Portugal youth international footballers
Portuguese expatriate footballers
Expatriate footballers in France
Sportspeople from Viseu District